Berkeley is a 2005 American drama film by Bobby Roth filmed in Berkeley, California. It stars Nick Roth, Laura Jordan, and Henry Winkler.

Synopsis
In 1968, an accounting student at UC Berkeley named Ben avoids the draft and enjoys sex, drugs and rock 'n' roll while protesting against the Vietnam War with his friends.

Cast
Nick Roth as Ben Sweet
Henry Winkler as Sy Sweet, Ben's father
Laura Jordan as Sadie
Bonnie Bedelia as Professor Hawkins

References

External links
 
 

2005 films
2005 drama films
Berkeley, California in fiction
Films directed by Bobby Roth
American drama films
Films set in California
Films scored by Christopher Franke
2000s English-language films
2000s American films